North Warwickshire and South Leicestershire College – Wigston Campus, previously known as South Leicestershire College is a general college of further education, which opened in 1970. Situated on the southern outskirts of Leicester, it draws students from across Leicestershire, but particularly from the south of the county. The college operates with a budget of around £30 million.

At the start of the academic year of 2017, South Leicestershire College merged with North Warwickshire and Hinckley College to form North Warwickshire and South Leicestershire college.

Location 

NWSLC operates predominantly out of five campuses. Wigston campus is a new multi-million pound campus in South Wigston.

South Wigston
NWSLC Wigston Campus first opened its doors to learners in September 2010. The Wigston Campus is situated next to Blaby Road Park, South Wigston. The Wigston Campus features classrooms and learning spaces, sauna, steam room, therapies suites and a boxing ring. This new campus also features a gym, with equipment supplied by the Leicester Tigers, a café, a library, an eating area named 'The Eating Place' and an area for learners in their free-time, named 'The Lounge'.

King Power Stadium
South Leicestershire College operated its business arm, Engage, from Leicester City F.C.'s King Power Stadium. Engage predominantly offered training to businesses as well as apprenticeships. Engage's King Power Stadium Campus also featured a recruitment service aimed at finding employment for young people seeking apprenticeships.

Belgrave Campus 
In 2008, the college launched its Belgrave Campus (Media Centre), located on Ross Walk. This centre hosted many of the college's media courses as well as studios for ITV Central and EAVA FM. It features a TV studio, radio station and production suites.

City Campus 
South Leicestershire College's business arm, Engage, ran many of its engineering courses from its City Campus, located on Freeman's Common, Leicester.

Other locations 
The college also had a number of specialist and dedicated off-site venues, these included links with many other training venues, including; The Sharma Centre, The Peepul Centre, Soar Valley Music Centre, Leicester Islamic Academy, Studio 79 and many more.

The college has a curriculum including the following subject areas: Accounting, Business Studies, Complementary Therapies, Computing, Construction, English for Speakers of Other Languages, Hair and Beauty, Health & Social Care, Humanities, Management and Professional programmes, Public Services, Retail, Skills for Life, Sport and Teacher Training.

Academy of Sport

The Academy of Sport was launched by South Leicestershire College to give opportunities to young people wanting to study and play professional sport at the same time. The college was partnered with some of the sporting clubs and players in the city and delivers several development centres with them. The Football Development Centre was run with Leicester City F.C. and is led by head coach, Matt Elliott. The Rugby Development Centre is run by coaches from the Leicester Tigers. The Boxing Development Centre is run with former boxer Barry McGuigan with its training sessions held in South Leicestershire College's Boxing gym, The Weigh In. The college also runs a Mixed Martial Arts Development Centre and a Basketball Development Centre ran by Leicester Riders.

References

External links
North Warwickshire and South Leicestershire College official website

Education in Leicester
Further education colleges in Leicestershire
Learning and Skills Beacons
Educational institutions established in 1970
1970 establishments in England